Caitlin Fang (born May 17, 2006) is a Taiwanese actress. She won the Golden Horse Award for Best New Performer and the Taipei Film Award for Best New Talent for her role in the film American Girl (2021). In 2022, at age 16, Fang became the youngest actor to receive nominations for all three acting awards from Golden Horse Award; namely, Best Leading Actress, Best New Performer and Best Supporting Actress − with the former two for American Girl and the latter for The Post-Truth World.

Filmography

Television series

Film

Music video appearances

Awards and nominations

References

External links 

 
 

2006 births
Living people
Taiwanese television actresses
Taiwanese film actresses
21st-century Taiwanese actresses